Corticotropin-like intermediate [lobe] peptide (CLIP), also known as adrenocorticotropic hormone fragment 18-39 (ACTH(18-39)), is a naturally occurring, endogenous neuropeptide with a docosapeptide structure and the amino acid sequence Arg-Pro-Val-Lys-Val-Tyr-Pro-Asn-Gly-Ala-Glu-Asp-Glu-Ser-Ala-Glu-Ala-Phe-Pro-Leu-Glu-Phe. CLIP is generated as a proteolyic cleavage product of adrenocorticotropic hormone (ACTH), which in turn is a cleavage product of proopiomelanocortin (POMC). Its physiological role has been investigated in various tissues, specifically in the central nervous system.

It has been suggested to function as an insulin secretagogue in the pancreas.

References

External links 
 

Neuropeptides